Ameranna florida is a species of sea snail, a marine gastropod mollusk in the family Pisaniidae.

Description

Distribution

References

 Garcia E.F. (2008). Four new buccinid species (Gastropoda: Buccinidae) from the western Atlantic. Novapex 9(4): 141-148
 Landau B. & Vermeij G.J. (2012) Caenozoic Research 9(1)

Pisaniidae
Gastropods described in 2008